Greater Vision is an American Southern gospel music trio founded in 1990. It is one of Southern gospel's most popular trios and has been noted for their prolonged commercial and musical success spanning over three decades. As of 2017, the group is made up of Gerald Wolfe, Rodney Griffin, Chris Allman and Jon Epley. Over the last several years, this trio has consistently been named Southern gospel's top male trio, winning the Singing News Awards and have placed numerous top songs on the Southern Gospel Charts and Radio.

Group history
The group formed in December 1990 when Mark Trammell left the Cathedral Quartet and teamed with Cathedrals alum Gerald Wolfe. They recruited tenor Chris Allman. The group quickly became a success. Their first project, On A Journey (1990), propelled them into seemingly overnight popularity. The group followed up with the albums You Can Have A Song (1992), 20 Inspirational Favorites (1993) and Serving A Risen Savior (1994), were all released on the Riversong/Benson Music Group label and was well received among fans and industry.  By 1997, the group had left the Riversong label and joined Daywind records, releasing new albums, including When I See The Cross.

Personnel changes
In 1993, Mark Trammell departed for Gold City and was replaced by Dixie Melody Boys baritone singer and bass guitarist Rodney Griffin. Allman left in late 1995 to attend seminary studies and was replaced by Jason Waldroup.  This lineup of Wolfe, Griffin, and Waldroup stayed intact for 13 years and was both immensely popular and successful. Waldroup's smooth tenor and Griffin's strong baritone and songwriting ability launched the group into the forefront of the gospel music scene.  In 2008, Waldroup decided to leave to pursue a seminary education. In May, Jacob Kitson was announced as the new tenor.  Kitson’s stay was short-lived.  In 2010, Chris Allman returned after an almost fifteen-year absence, thus coming back full circle to the almost original blend and sound. In 2017, John Epley joined the group to sing baritone.

Current lineup
In 2017, the group added Kentucky native Jon Epley to the group to sing baritone. Wolfe became emcee and piano player while Griffin moved into the lead slot and continued on the bass guitar, and Allman remained at tenor.

Second-Half quartet
In 2014, Greater Vision and the Mark Trammell Quartet appeared the same night at an event in Marion, Illinois. By combining the two groups during the second half of the concert, the moniker "Second Half Quartet" was formed. In 2015, Gerald Wolfe, Mark Trammell, Pat Barker, Rodney Griffin and Chris Allman took home a variety of awards at Gospel Music's premier award show, the Singing News Fan Awards. Mark Trammell was voted Favorite Baritone of the Year by fans, becoming the first Gospel singer to win such an award in four separate decades; Pat Barker took home the Favorite New Soloist award; Greater Vision's song, “For All He’s Done,” was voted Song of the Year and once again, Rodney Griffin was the recipient of the Favorite Songwriter Award.

Members (past and present)

Line-ups

Second-Half quartet members

Line-ups

Cathedrals Family Reunion members

Line-ups

Discography

Studio and Live Albumshttps://www.sghistory.com/index.php?n=G.GreaterVision1990shttps://www.sghistory.com/index.php?n=G.GreaterVision2010s
1991 You Can Have A Song
1991 On a Journey
1992 It's Just Like Heaven (also released in the Encore Series in 2005)(i)
1993 The King Came Down
1993 20 Inspirational Favorites
1994 Serving a Risen Savior
1994 Where He Leads Me
1995 Take Him at His Word
1996 The Shepherds Found a Lamb
1996 Sing It Again!
1997 When I See the Cross
1999 Far Beyond This Place
1999 A Greater Vision Christmas
2000 Perfect Candidate
2002 Live at First Baptist Church in Atlanta
2003 Quartets
2003  Live At The Palace (with Legacy Five)
2004 Faces
2006 My Favorite Place
2005 Fifteen
2006 Hymns of the Ages
2007 Everyday People
2008 Not Alone
2009 Live at Oak Tree
2010 20 Years: Live In Texas
2010 Welcome Back
2011 The Only Way
2012 Hymns of the Ages (Re-Issued)
2012 Our Most Requested... LIVE!
2013 For All He's Done
2015 As We Speak
2015 Jubilee Christmas Again
2017 Still
2018 Life Is A Song
2019 You’ve Arrived
2021 The Journey 
2022 Think About There

Compilation albums
1996  The Church Hymnal Series Volume One
1996  Sing It Again
1999  The Church Hymnal Series Volume Two
2000  Through The Years With Greater Vision: Our Southern Gospel Hits
2001  The Church Hymnal Series Volume Three
2004  Songs From the Stories
2005  Now & Then
2005 The Church Hymnal Series Volume Four
2008  Favorites From The Church Hymnal Series
2008  Featuring Jason Waldroup-13 Great Years, 13 Unforgettable Songs
2008  Memories Made New
2009  Jubilee (with The Booth Brothers and Legacy Five)
2009  Nothin' But Fast
2010 Jubilee 2
2010 Everything Christmas
2011 Sing It Again (Re-Issued)
2011 The Ones that Got Away (Songs from the Pen of Rodney Griffin)
2012 Jubilee 3
2012 Jubilee Christmas
2013 Jubilee Christmas A' CAPPELLA
2014 Where He Leads Me (Re-Issued)
2014 Because You Asked
2016 Greater Vision 25 Silver Edition 
2019 Our Very Best

Awards

Group Awards  
1999 Favorite Trio and Song of the Year: My Name Is Lazarus 
2000 Favorite Trio, Album of the Year: Far Beyond This Place, and Song of the Year: Just One More Soul
2001 Favorite Trio and Favorite Video: Live From Morristown
2002 Favorite Trio, Album of the Year: Live At First Baptist Atlanta, and Favorite Video: Live At First Baptist Atlanta
2003 Favorite Trio and Album of the Year: Quartets 
2004 Favorite Trio, Song of the Year: Just Ask, and Favorite Video: Quartets Live
2005 Favorite Trio and Song of the Year: Faces
2006 Favorite Trio
2010 Album of the Year: Jubilee (With Legacy Five and The Booth Brothers) 
2012 Song of the Year: I Know A Man Who Can
2014 Song of the Year: Preacher Tell Me Like It Is
2015 Song of the Year: For All He's Done
2019 Favorite Trio
2020 Favorite Trio
2022 Favorite Trio and Favorite Song: Start With Well Done

Number One Songs
1999   My Name is Lazarus
1999   Just One More Soul
2001   He’s Still Waiting By the Well
2011   Never Been
2012   I Know a Man Who Can
2013   Looking for the Grace
2014   Preacher Tell Me Like it Is
2014   For All He’s Done
2015   Put Out the Fire
2017   Never Will I Ever Again
2018   Still
2018   God Doesn’t Care
2019   Rolled Back Stone

References

American musical trios
Musical groups from Tennessee
Southern gospel performers